The Cockpit is a public house at 7 St Andrew's Hill in the City, London EC4.

It is a Grade II listed building, built in about 1860.

References

External links

Grade II listed pubs in the City of London